Rives d'Andaine is a commune in the department of Orne, northwestern France. The municipality was established on 1 January 2016 by merger of the former communes of La Chapelle-d'Andaine (the seat), Couterne, Geneslay and Haleine.

See also 
Communes of the Orne department

References 

Communes of Orne
Populated places established in 2016
2016 establishments in France